Pachysphinx modesta, the modest sphinx or poplar sphinx, is a moth of the family Sphingidae. The species was first described by Thaddeus William Harris in 1839.

Gallery

Distribution 
It ranges from the southern United States up and throughout Canada.

Biology 
Adults are on wing from mid-June to mid-July in Canada. In the northern part of the range, there is one generation with adults on wing from may to July. Farther south, there might be two generations per year.

The larvae feed on poplar, willow and cottonwood species.

References

External links

Smerinthini
Moths described in 1839
Moths of North America

Taxa named by Thaddeus William Harris